Lord of Appeal may refer to:
 Lords of Appeal in Ordinary (also known as Law Lords), members of the House of Lords formerly appointed under the Appellate Jurisdiction Act 1876 to exercise its judicial functions
Lords of Appeal, members of the House of Lords who exercised its judicial functions, but who were not appointed under the Appellate Jurisdiction Act 1876
Lord Justice of Appeal, a judge of the Court of Appeal of England and Wales
 Lords Appellant, a group of nobles in the reign of King Richard II who sought to impeach several of the King's favourites in the 1380s